The Defence Production Sharing Agreement is a bilateral trade agreement between the United States and Canada that aims to balance the amount of military cross-border buying in order to avoid trade imbalances. Since its signing in 1956, it has led to a number of US companies sending military production to Canada in order to "offset" Canadian purchases of US military equipment. The Agreement has been amended on several occasions. The similar Defense Development Sharing Program organized sharing of military research and development.

External links
Defence Production Sharing Agreement between Canada and The United States of America (pdf)

References

United States–North American relations